Death in absentia may refer to:

 Declared death in absentia
 Sentenced to death in absentia, see trial in absentia

See also 
 In absentia (disambiguation)